Michael Clinton Irby (born November 16, 1972) is an American actor known for portraying Sergeant First Class Charles Grey in the CBS series The Unit (2006–2009), and more recently, for his work as Obispo 'Bishop' Losa in Mayans M.C. (2018–) and Cristobal Sifuentes on the HBO series Barry (2018–).

Early life and education
Irby was born in Palm Springs, California, the son of Ernie and Cynthia Ann Irby. He is of mixed Mexican-American and African-American heritage and has two brothers, Jason and Ernest III.

With a lifelong love for association football, he played in Europe as part of Team USA before he was forced to give it up due to injury.

Following the end of his football career, he attended College of the Desert in Palm Desert, California and Orange Coast College in Costa Mesa, California. His drama professor encouraged him to pursue a career in theater at the American Academy of Dramatic Arts, New York City.

Personal life
Irby is married to Susan Matus, whom he met while studying in New York. They have a son named Adison James Bear Irby.

Selected filmography

Silent Prey (1997) as Assistant D.A. Oniz
Law & Order (1999–2000, TV Series) as John Acosta / Diego Garza / Boca
Mourning Glory (2001) as Luis
Piñero (2001) as Reinaldo Povod
The Last Castle (2001) as Enriquez
MDs (2002, TV Series) as Jaime Lopez
Haunted (2002, TV Series) as Dante
CSI: Miami (2002, TV Series) as Ignatio Paez
Final Draft (2003) as Elijah
Klepto (2003) as Marco
Line of Fire (2003–2005, TV Series) as Amiel Macarthur
CSI: NY (2004–2011, TV Series) as Kenny Hexton / Eduardo
Flightplan (2005) as Obaid
Once Upon a Wedding (2005) as Luis
The Unit (2006–2009, TV Series) as Charles Grey
Law Abiding Citizen (2009) as Detective Garza
NCIS: Los Angeles (2010, TV Series) as Montrell Perez
24 (2010, TV Series) as Adrion Bishop
Lie to Me (2010, TV Series) as Ronnie Bacca
Louis (2010) as Robichaux
Faster (2010) as Vaquero
Fast Five (2011) as Zizi
Bones (2011, TV Series) as Police Officer
The Protector (2011, TV Series) as Roberto Casas
Dirty People (2012) as Robert
Common Law (2012, TV Series) as Jason
The Mentalist (2012, Season 5, Episode 4: "Blood Feud") as Beltran
K-11 (2012) as Lieutenant Hernandez
Person of Interest (2012, TV Series) as Fermin Ordoñez
Elementary (2013, Season 1, Episode 15: "A Giant Gun, Filled with Drugs") as Xande Diaz
Vegas (2013, Season 1, Episode 17: "Hollywood Ending") as Eddie Bade
Hawaii Five-0 (2013, Season 3, Episode 24: "Aloha, Malama Pono") as Rafael Salgado
Almost Human (2013–2014, TV Series) as Detective Richard Paul
Crisis (2014, TV Series) as Khani
The Following (2015, TV Series) as Andrew Sharp
CSI: Cyber (2015, TV Series) as Navy Cap. David Ortega M.D.
True Detective (2015, TV Series) as Detective Elvis Ilinca
Rosewood (2015, TV Series) as Agent Giordano
Taken (2017, TV Series) as Scott
SEAL Team (2017-2018, TV Series) as Master Chief Special Warfare Operator Adam Seaver
Mayans M.C. (2018–present, TV Series) as Obispo 'Bishop' Losa
Barry (2018–, TV Series) as Cristobal Sifuentes
Duke (2019) as Evelio
Bolden! (2019)
The Expanse (2020, TV Series) as Admiral Delgado
Last Seen Alive (2022) as Oscar

References

External links

Michael Irby Bio at CBS - The Unit
 "Michael Irby - The Invisible Artist". Retrieved on 2008-07-23.

1972 births
20th-century American male actors
21st-century American male actors
American Academy of Dramatic Arts alumni
American male film actors
American male television actors
American male actors of Mexican descent
Living people
Male actors from Palm Springs, California
Orange Coast College alumni
People from Riverside County, California